The Kresling fold is a folding pattern which naturally arises under torsional load. It is named after Biruta Kresling, a Paris-based architect born in Berlin in 1942, who has published extensive research deployable structures, and in particular on the properties of the Kresling fold. Under the right conditions, when a sheet of paper is wrapped around two coaxial cylinders separated by a gap and the cylinders are twisted in opposite directions, the paper buckles into regular slanted folds, pulling the cylinders towards one another, and producing the so-called Kresling fold.

The Kresling fold is related to the Miura-Ori, Hexagonal and Yoshimura folding patterns, and have been framed as different parametrizations of a common folding pattern by Reid et al. When assembled into a structure, the Kresling fold takes the shape of a twisted prism with a regular polygonal base.

Creasing pattern 

The creasing patterns of the Kresling fold form a tessellation of the surface by parallelograms scored along their longer diagonal. The parallelograms are arranged into rows of parallelograms stacked atop one another, each of which will correspond to a "level" in the assembled structure. Parallelograms of successive rows are skewed either towards the left or the right. The Kresling fold is fully parametrized by the number of parallelograms per row -corresponding to the number of sides of the base polygon when assembled- the pitch angle of the parallelogram, the number of levels and their pitch direction (left or right).

Manufacturing 
The Kresling fold can be constructed from a thin sheet of material in the same way as an origami, typically by scoring and cutting the appropriate creasing pattern into a thin sheet of material, gluing the material into a cylinder, and folding the cylinder into the final structure. The sheet can be manually pre-creased by embossing the material with a ball point pen or scoring stylus, or automatically using a die-cutting machine, a CNC cutting machine, or a laser cutter.

Apart from regular paper, commonly used materials are polypropylene and polyethylene, due to their durability and ability to cycle through thousands of folds without tearing. Several other materials such as Mylar, Tyvek, Kapton, UHMWPE, and ETFE have also been considered for aerospace purposes, due to the "harsh environment of space" such as "extreme temperature fluctuations, high UV radiation, and occasional dust storms".

Applications 
In the context of space exploration, researchers have proposed replacing traditional metal bellows with bellows based on the Kresling fold. Mars rover drills currently use metal bellows to protect the drilling shaft and Martian dust and could potentially be replaced with Kresling bellows. Sunshields for space telescopes using the Kresling pattern have also been proposed. The main advantages of the Kresling fold compared to traditional metal bellows lie in their reduced mass and high compression ratio, which are factors that "often constrain spacecraft design". 

Another application of the Kresling fold exploits their bistable properties; for certain parameters, it have been shown that the Kresling fold exhibits two stable positions: collapsed and extended.  When tuned correctly, the bistable property has been shown to act as an effective shock absorber.

Due to its mechanical and aesthetic properties, the Kresling fold has found applications in consumer goods as well. The Smokordian is a portable gravity bong which uses the Kresling folding pattern as bellows. A neoprene wine carrier with the Kresling pattern has been developed as well. 

Recently, researchers have created an octopus-like robotic arm, which actuates a Kresling pattern using electromagnets. The twisting motion generated by the magnetic fields is converted into a compressive or expanding motion, allowing the robotic arm to move in space.

References 

Mechanical engineering
Paper folding
German inventions
Mechanics
Structural analysis